The Pacific Southwest District is one of the 35 districts of the Lutheran Church–Missouri Synod (LCMS). It covers Southern California (the eight southernmost counties in California, including the Los Angeles metropolitan area), Arizona and the southern tip of Nevada, and includes approximately 291 congregations subdivided into 32 circuits, as well as 72 preschools, 65 elementary schools and nine high schools. Baptized membership of Pacific Southwest congregations is approximately 91,682.

The remainder of California and Nevada is included in the California-Nevada-Hawaii District; one Arizona congregation is in the Rocky Mountain District. In addition, 28 congregations in the Pacific Southwest District's area are in the non-geographic English District – 16 in Arizona, six in the San Diego area and five in the Los Angeles area.

The Pacific Southwest District was formed on July 2, 1930 as the Southern California District, separating it from the California and Nevada District. District offices are located in Irvine, California. Delegates from each congregation meet in convention every three years to elect the district president, vice presidents, circuit counselors, a board of directors, and other officers. The Rev. Dr. Michael E. Gibson has been the district president since September 2018.

Concordia University, Irvine, part of the LCMS' Concordia University System, is located within the district.

Presidents
 Rev. Gotthold H. F. Smukal, 1930–42
 Rev. Walter F. Troeger, 1942–48
 Rev. Armand E. T. Mueller, 1948–55
 Rev. Victor L. Behnken, 1955–69
 Rev. Arnold G. Kuntz, 1969–85
 Rev. Loren T. Kramer, 1985–2000
 Rev. Larry A. Stoterau, 2000–18
 Rev. Michael E. Gibson, 2018–Present

References

External links
 
 LCMS: Pacific Southwest District
 LCMS Congregation Directory
  

Lutheran Church–Missouri Synod districts
Lutheranism in Arizona
Lutheranism in California
Lutheranism in Nevada
Christian organizations established in 1930